Ludhar is a village and union council of Jhelum District in the Punjab Province of Pakistan. It is part of Dina Tehsil, and is located at 33°4'40"N 73°37'38"E with an altitude of 303 metres (997 feet). Most of the population belong to the Panhwar Sohlan Rajput's.

References

Populated places in Tehsil Dina
Union councils of Dina Tehsil